In probability theory, a Markov kernel (also known as a stochastic kernel or probability kernel) is a map that in the general theory of Markov processes plays the role that the transition matrix does in the theory of Markov processes with a finite state space.

Formal definition 

Let  and  be measurable spaces. A Markov kernel with source  and target  is a map  with the following properties: 
 For every (fixed) , the map  is -measurable 
 For every (fixed) , the map  is a probability measure on  
In other words it associates to each point  a probability measure  on  such that, for every measurable set , the map  is measurable with respect to the -algebra .

Examples

Simple random walk on the integers  
Then a Markov kernel is fully determined by the probability it assigns to singletons  for each :
.
Now the random walk    that goes to the right with probability   and to the left with probability  is defined by 

where  is the Kronecker delta. The transition probabilities  for the random walk are equivalent to the Markov kernel.

General Markov processes with countable state space 
Again a Markov kernel is defined by the probability it assigns to singleton sets for each 
,
We define a Markov process by defining a transition probability  where the numbers  define a (countable) stochastic matrix  i.e. 
  
We then define 
.
Again the transition probability, the stochastic matrix and the Markov kernel are equivalent reformulations.

Markov kernel defined by a kernel function and a measure  
,
then  i.e. the mapping 

defines a Markov kernel. This example generalises the countable Markov process example where  was the counting measure. Moreover it encompasses other important examples such as the convolution kernels, in particular the Markov kernels defined by the heat equation.
.

Measurable functions 
Take  and  arbitrary measurable spaces, and let  be a measurable function. Now define  i.e. 
 for all . 
Note that the indicator function  is -measurable for all  iff  is measurable.   

This example allows us to think of a Markov kernel as a generalised function with a (in general) random rather than certain value. That is, it is a multivalued function where the values are not equally weighted.

Galton–Watson process 
As a less obvious example, take , and  the real numbers  with the standard sigma algebra of Borel sets.  Then

with i.i.d. random variables  (usually with mean 0) and where  is the indicator function. For the simple case of coin flips this models the different levels of a Galton board.

Composition of Markov Kernels and the Markov Category

Given measurable spaces ,   we consider a Markov kernel  as a morphism .
.
The composition is associative by the Monotone Convergence Theorem and the identity function considered as a Markov kernel (i.e. the delta measure  ) is the unit for this composition. 

This composition defines the structure of a category on the measurable spaces with Markov kernels as morphisms first defined by Lawvere. The category has the empty set as initial object and the one point set  as the terminal object. From this point of view a probability space  is the same thing as a pointed space  in the Markov category.

Probability Space defined by Probability Distribution and a Markov Kernel 
A composition of a probability space  and a probability kernel  defines a probability space , where the probability measure is given by

Properties

Semidirect product 

Regular conditional distribution 

Let  be a Borel space,  a -valued random variable on the measure space  and  a sub--algebra.

It is called regular conditional distribution of  given  and is not uniquely defined.

Generalizations 
Transition kernels generalize Markov kernels in the sense that for all , the map

can be any type of (non negative) measure,  not necessarily a probability measure.

References 

 
 §36. Kernels and semigroups of kernels

Markov processes